The Cruck barn on the Ty Coch estate at Llangynhafal, Denbighshire, is a timber framed building, which has been dated by dendrochronology to 1430.  It is one of the earliest timber-framed buildings in Wales. Although there is evidence that the building was a house originally, it was converted to agricultural use and is often described as a barn.

The significance of the barn was recognised by Cadw in 2002 when it was listed as a Grade II listed building.  Previously the building had been thought to be 17th century. It has recently been restored by the Denbighshire County Council, with European and other grant funding, as part of a small workshop complex.

Description
It is a 5-bay cruck structure. The building was originally a house consisting of an inner room (one bay), a hall with passage (2 bays), and a cow house (2 bays).

The end gables were replaced in stone, probably in the 18th century with side walls that are 3-panel high timber-framing, infilled originally with brick nogging, resting on a plinth of rubble stonework. To the north side the timber-framing is largely intact, but to the south, much of the timber-framing has had to be  replaced. Timbers at the upper end show signs of smoke blackening, indicating that it was formerly a house. Mortices survive for wind-braces – two to each bay. The matching ‘blades’ of each cruck truss are sawn on only one surface, with the other surface curved. This is a result of the vertical separation of the matching curved branch that formed the cruck, after being cut from a tree..

Literature
 Alcock N W Cruck Construction: An introduction and catalogue. CBA Research Report no 42, 1981.
 Alcock, N. W., Barley, M. W. et al. (1996), Recording timber-framed buildings – An illustrated glossary, Council for British Archaeology, York. 
 Smith P Houses of the Welsh Countryside, 2nd Edition, 1988, HMSO/ RCAHMW
 Suggett R and Stevenson G Introducing Houses of the Welsh Countryside. Cyflwyno Cartrefi Cefn Gwlad Cymru, Y Lolfa/ RCAHMW, 2010

References

External links
 Investigation by the Royal Commission on the Ancient and Historical Monuments of Wales 
CPAT entry on Archwilio

Houses in Denbighshire
Grade II listed buildings in Denbighshire
Barns in Wales
Timber-framed buildings in Wales
Llangynhafal